The 2016–17 Missouri Valley Conference men's basketball season began with practices in October 2016, followed by the start of the 2016–17 NCAA Division I men's basketball season in November. Conference play began on December 28, 2016, and concluded in March.

Illinois State and Wichita State shared the regular season championship with matching records of 17–1. Due to tiebreakers, Illinois State received the conference's No. 1 seed in the Missouri Valley Conference tournament.

Illinois State's Paris Lee was named Conference Player of the Year and Dan Muller was named Coach of the Year.

The MVC Tournament was held from March 2–5 at the Scottrade Center in St. Louis, Missouri. Wichita State defeated Illinois State to win the tournament championship. As a result, the Shockers received the conference's automatic bid to the NCAA tournament. No other MVC team received a bid to the NCAA Tournament. Illinois State received a bid to the National Invitation Tournament.

The season marked Wichita State's final season as an MVC member. Shortly after the end of the NCAA Tournament, the Shockers announced their departure for the American Athletic Conference, effective July 1, 2017.

Head coaches

Coaches 

Notes: 
 All records, appearances, titles, etc. are from time with current school only. 
 Year at school includes 2016–17 season.
 Overall and MVC records are from time at current school and are through the end of the 2016–17 season.
 Fourth-year head coach Ray Giacoletti resigned on December 6, 2016 after the first eight games of the season. Assistant coach Jeff Rutter was named interim head coach.

Preseason

Preseason poll 
Source

Preseason All-MVC teams

Source

Regular season
According to college basketball statistical guru Ken Pomeroy, the MVC had "the most unusual conference table in the land" for the season. The co-champions Illinois State and Wichita State were the only two teams that finished above .500 in conference play, each finishing with only one conference loss (splitting their two regular-season matchups). This made the MVC the first Division I conference to have two men's teams finish with no more than one conference loss since the MEAC in 2013, and also marked the first time that a Division I conference with 10 or more members had only two teams with winning league records since the MVC itself in 2012 (which had a five-team tie for third place at 9–9).

Head-to-head results

Player of the week

Conference Awards 
Source

Postseason

Missouri Valley Conference tournament

Teams were seeded by conference record, with ties broken by record between the tied teams followed by overall adjusted RPI, if necessary. The top six seeds received first-round byes.

NCAA tournament 

The winner of the MVC tournament received an automatic bid to the 2017 NCAA Division I men's basketball tournament.

National Invitation tournament 

One MVC team, Illinois State, received an invitation to the National Invitation Tournament.

References

 
Missouri Valley Conference men's basketball tournament